The Mercyhurst Lakers women's ice hockey team is a college ice hockey program representing Mercyhurst University in NCAA Division I competition as a member of the College Hockey America (CHA) conference. They play in Erie, Pennsylvania at the Mercyhurst Ice Center, located on the Mercyhurst campus.

The program was started in 1999 and Michael Sisti has been its only coach. From 2000 to 2002, the Lakers were part of the Great Lakes Women's Hockey Association (GLWHA). While in the Great Lakes Women's Hockey Association, the Lakers qualified for the GLWHA tournament twice – in 2001, and 2002. The Lakers were regular season champions in 2000–01 and 2001–02, and won the playoff championship in 2002. For the 2002–03 season, the Lakers joined the College Hockey America conference.

History

1999 to 2002: Great Lakes Women's Hockey Association

The Mercyhurst women's hockey program predates NCAA governance in the sport. The Great Lakes Women's Hockey Association was formed by Mercyhurst University in Erie, Pennsylvania, the University of Findlay in Findlay, Ohio and Wayne State University in Detroit, Michigan, when the Title IX law protecting equity in sports was making major changes to women's athletics.

A Mercyhurst Men's Assistant Coach since 1993, Michael Sisti, was named the inaugural head coach. As of the end of the 2019–20 season, he remains the only head coach in the program's history. Sisti had been a star forward for Canisius College, where he graduated in 1990.

Mercyhurst was immediately successful in the GLWHA. They were 23-6-0 in 1999–00. Most of their games were shutout wins, and scored 10 or more goals on six occasions.

In 2000-01 they were far less successful, going 14-16-3, playing more established programs.

In 2001–02, they saw great success again, with a 24-8-1 record, and the final GLWHA Championship.

College Hockey America through 2005-06

As the NCAA became the primary governing body of women's hockey, the conferences began to merge with existing men's conferences. The Mercyhurst men were part of the Metro Atlantic Conference, while Findlay and Wayne States' men's programs were in College Hockey America, which began organizing as a women's conference as well. The new CHA women's conference included Mercyhust, Findlay and Wayne State from the GLWHA, and Niagara University.

In the first four years of the conference, Mercyhurst dominated the competition. Within the conference, they were 38-1-3, winning every regular season, and every tournament. Their overall record was 102-29-13 for the same period. In the first two years of the conference, the CHA a smaller conference against much more storied conferences, like the ECAC and the WCHA. As a result, Mercyhurst did not receive a bid to appear in the NCAA Tournament. In 2005, the Lakers received their first bid, traveling to powerful Harvard University on March 19. The ensuing game was one of the most bitterly fought in tournament history, with Harvard prevailing 5–4 in the third overtime period. During that game, Mercyhurst goaltender Desirae "Desi" Clark set a single game save record of 78 stops. That record still stands at the Division I level , the end of the 2019–20 season. In the following year, the Lakers had similar bad luck, this time losing to Wisconsin in 2 overtimes.

The CHA Conference saw some changes, as Findlay dropped their program in 2004, and the Robert Morris Colonials joining for 2005–06, after Quinnipiac joined for a single year (2004–05).

The Meghan Agosta years

By the mid-2000s Mercyhurst College (it would become Mercyhurst University in 2012), had several advantages in recruiting: The college itself, a small Catholic institution with very good academics; The success and graduation rate of its athletes; and, the overwhelming success of the team. The campus location near Lake Ontario was attractive to young women from Ontario, New York and Pennsylvania, a large pool of talent.

In 2006, the Lakers attracted Megan Agosta, perhaps the most sought-after talent in the NCAA. Even before attending college, she had won an Olympic gold medal at the 2006 Turin games with Team Canada. She became one of the best players of the decade in NCAA play.

Agosta would be the first ever freshman to be a top three finalist for the Patty Kazmaier Award.

In 2007, Mercyhurst successfully recruited Vicki Bendus, who would win the 2010 Patty Kazmaier Award as the nation's top player, and was a top-10 finalist in the following year.

In addition, the Lakers recruited Katariina Soikkanen of the Finnish National team, as well as Angelica Lorsell and Johanna Malmstrom who played for the Swedish National Team. The Lakers also had four players on the roster who played on the Canadian Under-22 Team. Mercyhurst had two CHA First Team selections in 2006–07, one second team choice, the Player and Rookie of the Year, and four members of the All-Rookie Team.

With the addition of these players, in addition to a potent roster in totality, Mercyhurst achieved even more success.

During her college career, Agosta would score 157 goals and 303 points, both NCAA records. Her international play meant substantial time off from the Mercyhirst team, making these records all the more impressive.

The best year in Mercyhurst history came in 2009–10. In that season, the Lakers started the season with a record of 19 wins, 1 loss and 3 ties (Conference Record, 6–0–1). They were the top ranked team in the USA TODAY/USA Hockey Magazine poll for 14 consecutive weeks and were the unanimous choice with all 19 first-place votes eight times. Their only loss came in an October home split with Minnesota-Duluth until the Nation Championship game against Wisconsin on March 22, 2009, which they lost 5–0. It was the Laker's only NCAA Championship Game. During that season, Meghan Agosto took time away to participate in her second Olympic games, this time in Vancouver, Canada. She won her second gold medal and was named the Most Valuable Player in women's hockey in the Olympic Games.

Continued Success in the 2010s

To date, the Mercyhurst program continues to be successful, if no longer dominant in the CHA conference. In 2013 and 2014, the Lakers appeared in back-to-back Frozen Four contests. These teams were led by forward Christine Bestland, a captain for two years, national recognition by USCHO. com, and two time MVP of the CHA conference.

Upon Bestland's graduation, Mercyhurst's successes were more modest, despite the leadership of forward Emily Janiga and defenseman Molly Byrne. The Lakers earned their record-setting 10th consecutive NCAA Tournament appearance in 2014.

In 2015, Mercyhurst failed to earn a berth in the national tournament, while still posting a 23-9-3 record and a regular season conference title. In the following year, the team returned to the tournament after a one-year hiatus.

From 2017 to 2019, the Lakers enjoyed success, but contended with rival CHA program Robert Morris for conference leadership. The 2016-17 team posted a 15-18-4 record, their first and only losing record since NCAA competition began in 2001–02, as of the end of 2020. Their 3rd place CHA finish was the lowest ranking in Mercyhurst history, but still good enough for the team to stay in the top tier of the conference.

In the 2017–18 season, Mercyhurst began to establish a resurgence of top-tier success, with the recruiting of three international medalists from the Finnish national team: forward Vilma Tanskanen (2018–19), forward Emma Nuutinen (2017–2020), and goaltender Jenna Silvonen (2019–). Tanskanen and Nuutinen were transfers from the North Dakota Fighting Hawks women's ice hockey team, following the abrupt cancellation of the University of North Dakota‘s program. Nuutinen had the additional accomplishment of earning an Olympic bronze medal at the 2018 Winter Olympics.

Mercyhurst appeared in another NCAA tournament in 2018 and received a berth in 2020. The 2020 Tournament, however, was cancelled due to the COVID-19 pandemic.

Season by season results
Note: GP = Games played, W = Wins, L = Losses, T = Ties

Coaches

All-time coaching records

Current roster
As of August 29, 2022.

Individual player records

Career records 
Scoring

Top scoring record holders over career with the Mercyhurst Lakers, valid through conclusion of the 2020–21 season.

Goaltending

Top goaltending record holders over career with the Mercyhurst Lakers, valid through conclusion of the 2020–21 season.

Single-season records 
Scoring

Top single-season scoring record holders of the Mercyhurst Lakers, valid through conclusion of the 2020–21 season. Table includes the top ten players in each statistic: goals, assists, points, and points per game.

Goaltending

Top single-season goaltending record holders of the Mercyhurst Lakers, valid through conclusion of the 2020–21 season.

National team players

Canada 
Lakers players and alumni who have represented Canada with the women's national ice hockey team, the national women's development (under-22) ice hockey team, and/or the women's national under-18 ice hockey team in international competition; listed with highlights from their national careers. 
Meghan Agosta, three-time Olympic gold medalist (2006, 2010, 2014), Olympic silver medalist (2018), two-time World Championship gold medalist (2007, 2012), and six-time World Championship silver medalist (2008, 2009, 2011, 2013, 2016, 2017)
Vicki Bendus, World Championship gold medalist (2012), two-time Four Nations Cup gold medalist (2010, 2013), and Four Nations Cup silver medalist (2011)
Christine Bestland, World U18 Championship gold medalist (2010) and World U18 Championship silver medalist (2009)
Bailey Bram, Olympic silver medalist (2018), World Championship gold medalist (2012), and four-time World Championship silver medalist (2013, 2015, 2016, 2017)
Harrison Browne, World U18 Championship silver medalist (2011)
Laura Hosier, Air Canada Cup gold medalist (2007)
Jess Jones, World U18 Championship silver medalist (2008)
Stephanie Jones, Air Canada Cup gold medalist (2007)
Jesse Scanzano, MLP Nations Cup gold medalist (2010)
Alexa Vasko, World U18 Championship silver medalis (2017)

Finland 
Lakers players and alumni who have represented Finland with the women's national ice hockey team and/or the women's national under-18 ice hockey team in international competition; listed with highlights from their national careers.

 Emma Nuutinen, Olympic bronze medalist (2018), World Championship silver medalist (2019), and two-time World Championship bronze medalist (2015, 2017)
 Jenna Silvonen, World Championship silver medalist (2019), World Championship bronze medalist (2021)
 Vilma Tanskanen, Olympian (2014) and World Championship bronze medalist (2015)

United States 
Lakers players and alumni who have represented the United States with the women's national ice hockey team and/or the women's national under-18 ice hockey team in international competition; listed with highlights from their national careers.
Kelley Steadman, two-time World Championship gold medalist (2011, 2013)

Inline hockey 
The following Mercyhurst alumnae have also competed for the Canada women's national inline hockey team, participating in the FIRS Inline Hockey World Championships.

Michelle Bonello 
Jackie Jarrell (2006–2019)
Samantha Shirley

Award winners

Patty Kazmaier Award 
Players listed only at the highest level of recognition attained in the year(s) noted (i.e. Top 3 Finalists are not also listed under Top 10 or Nominees, though they also reached those designations).

Patty Kazmaier Award Winners

 Vicki Bendus – 2010

Patty Kazmaier Award Top 3 Finalists

 Meghan Agosta – 2007, 2008, 2009, 2011

Patty Kazmaier Award Top 10 Finalists

 Christine Bestland – 2014
 Vicki Bendus – 2011
 Bailey Bram – 2010, 2012
 Desi Clark – 2005
 Jesse Scanzano – 2010

Patty Kazmaier Award Nominees
Bailey Bram – 2010
Kelley Steadman – 2012
Source:

NCAA awards 
Frozen Four All-Tournament Team
Meghan Agosta – 2009

All-Americans 
Meghan Agosta, 2009 RBK Hockey/AHCA First Team All-American
Meghan Agosta, 2011 First Team All-America selection
Vicki Bendus, 2010 Women's RBK Hockey Division I All-America First Team
Jesse Scanzano, 2010 Women's RBK Hockey Division I All-America Second Team

CHA Awards
Meghan Agosta, 2009 CHA Player of the Year
Meghan Agosta, 2009 CHA Three Star Player of the Year
Meghan Agosta, 2009 All-CHA First Team
Meghan Agosta, 2009 CHA All-Tournament Team 
Vicki Bendus, 2008 CHA Rookie of the Year
Vicki Bendus, 2008 CHA All-Rookie Team 
Bailey Bram, 2009 CHA Rookie of the Year
Bailey Bram, 2009 CHA All-Rookie Team 
Bailey Bram, CHA Player of the Month (Month of October 2011)
Molly Bryne: 2014–15 All-CHA First Team
Molly Bryne: 2014–15 CHA Best Defenseman
Jenna Dingeldein: 2014–15 All-CHA Second Team
CJ Ireland, Mercyhurst Senior Athlete of the Year (female)
Emily Janiga:  2014–15 All-CHA First Team
Emily Janiga: 2014–15 CHA Player of the Year
Emily Janiga: 2014–15 CHA Scoring Trophy
Emily Janiga: CHA Player of the Month (March 2015) 
Stephanie Jones, CHA All-Tournament Team
Stephanie Jones, CHA Student Athlete of the Year
Stephanie Jones, Bill Smith Award (an in-house honor for meritorious service on-and-off-the ice) 
Amanda Makela: 2014–15 CHA Goaltender Trophy
Hillary Pattenden, 2009 All-CHA Second Team
Hillary Pattenden, 2009 CHA All-Rookie Team
Hillary Pattenden, 2009 CHA All-Tournament Team 
Hillary Pattenden, CHA Player of the Month (Month of October 2011)
Ashley Pendleton: CHA Defensive Player of the Week (Week of January 27, 2004)
Ashley Pendleton: 2004 CHA All-Rookie Team
Ashley Pendleton: 2005 CHA All-Conference First Team
Ashley Pendleton: 2006 First Team All-CHA
Ashley Pendleton: 2007 First Team All-CHA 
Sarah Robello: 2014–15 CHA All- Rookie Team
Jesse Scanzano, 2008 CHA All-Rookie Team 
Rachael Smith: 2016 Rookie of the Year, All-Rookie Team: (F)
Sarah McDonnell: 2016 Goaltending Trophy, All-Rookie Team
J'nai Mahadeo: 2016 All-CHA Second Team (D)
Molly Blasen: 2016 All-Rookie Team (D)
Jenna Dingeldein: 2016 Tournament MVP, All-Tournament Team
Morgan Stacey: 2015–16 co-Student-Athlete of the Year
Kelley Steadman, 2011–12 CHA Player of the Year

NCAA Statistical leaders
 Meghan Agosta, NCAA leader, 2006–07 season, Game winning goals, 11
 Meghan Agosta, NCAA leader, 2006–07 season, Goals per game, 1.09
 Meghan Agosta, NCAA leader, 2006–07 season, Short handed goals (tied), 6
 Meghan Agosta, NCAA leader, 2007–08 season, Short handed goals, 7
 Meghan Agosta, NCAA leader, 2007–08 season, Goals per game, 1.21
 Meghan Agosta, NCAA leader, 2008–09 season, Game winning goals, 10
 Meghan Agosta, NCAA leader, 2009–10 season, Assists per game, 1.16
 Meghan Agosta, NCAA leader, 2008–09 season, Goals per game, 1.29
 Vicki Bendus, NCAA leader, 2009–10 season, Short handed goals (tied), 5
 Bailey Bram, NCAA leader, 2009–10 season, Short handed goals (tied), 5
 Valerie Chouinard, NCAA leader, 2006–07 season, Power play goals, 17
Desirae Clark, NCAA leader, 2004–05 season, Goals against average, 1.25
 Hillary Pattenden, NCAA leader, 2008–09 season, Goalie winning percentage, .889
 Hillary Pattenden, NCAA leader, 2009–10 season, Goalie winning percentage, .871
Tiffany Ribble, NCAA leader, 2002–03 season, Save percentage, .932
Tiffany Ribble, NCAA leader, 2002–03 season, Goals Against Average, .932
Jesse Scanzano, NCAA leader, 2009–10 season, Shorthanded goals, 4
 Jesse Scanzano, NCAA leader, 2009–10 season, Points per game, 1.97
 Jesse Scanzano, NCAA leader, 2009–10 season, Assists per game, 1.36
 Sarah McDonnell: 2015–16: Freshman GAA, 1.75
 2015–16: Penalty minutes (404); Penalty minutes per game, 11.5

CHA statistical leaders 
 Emily Janiga: 2015–16: Shorthanded points, 3 (tied); Shorthanded goals, 3
 Rachael Smith: 2015–16: Freshman scoring: 29, Freshman goals: 11, Freshman points per game: .85
 Sarah McDonnell: 2015–16: Winning percentage, .696 (17-6-5), Wins (17)

USCHO honors
Laura Hosier, 2004–05 All USCHO.com Rookie Team
Michael Sisti, USCHO.com Coach of the Year

Lakers in professional hockey
NOTE: Kylie Rossler became an American football player with the Regina Rage of the Lingerie Football League (rebranded as Legends Football League in 2013).

NOTE: Hillary Pattenden was the first overall selection in the 2012 CWHL Draft but never appeared in the league.

See also
 List of college women's ice hockey coaches with 250 wins (Michael Sisti ranks seventh on all-time list)
 Mercyhurst Lakers men's ice hockey

References

External links
 

 

 
Ice hockey teams in Pennsylvania